Jacob Kuechler (1823–1893) was surveyor, conscientious objector during the Civil War, and commissioner of the Texas General Land Office.  Kuechler pioneered the science of dendrochronology to date natural events.

Early life and education
Jacob Kuechler was born in Schoellenbach, Hesse-Darmstadt, on February 18, 1823, to engineering and forestry official Albrecht Kuechler. Jacob Kuechler graduated from the University of Giessen with degrees in civil engineering and forestry.

Texas
Kuechler arrived in Galveston on July 4, 1847, on the ship St. Pauli from Hamburg.  He was part of the Darmstadt free-thinker fraternity of intellectuals from the universities of Giessen and Heidelberg and the Gewerbeschule of Darmstadt.  They founded the Fisher–Miller Land Grant community of Bettina, Texas, after John O. Meusebach negotiated the Meusebach–Comanche Treaty in 1847.  Bettina failed after the Adelsverein funding expired, and due to conflict of structure and authorities.  The members dispersed to other communities, and Kuechler moved to Pedernales, Texas, to take up farming and ranching with the Lungkwitz and Petri families.

As Gillespie County surveyor, he pioneered dendrochronology at Fredericksburg during the drought of the late 1850s by comparing tree-ring sequences for dating natural events.  The Kuechler study was published in 1859 as "Das Klima von Texas" in Gustav Schleicher's Texas Staats-Zeitung and 1861 in the Texas Almanac.

Nueces massacre and exile
In 1861, Texas seceded from the Union, and joined the Confederate States of America.  Upon recommendation by Samuel Maverick, Jacob Kuechler was commissioned as a captain by Sam Houston to enroll state militia troops in Gillespie County. Kuechler signed up only German Unionists in his frontier company, and was dismissed by Governor Francis R. Lubbock. In  1862,  Confederate authorities imposed martial law on Central Texas. Jacob Kuechler served as a guide for 61 conscientious objectors attempting to flee to Mexico.  In what later became known as the Nueces massacre, Confederate irregular James Duff and his Duff’s Partisan Rangers pursued and overtook  them at the Nueces River.Thirty-four were  killed, some executed after being taken prisoner. Jacob Kuechler survived the battle. The cruelty shocked the people of Gillespie County. About 2000 people took to the hills to escape Duff's reign of terror.  Kuechler remained in exile in Mexico, working as a surveyor until 1867.

Return to Texas
Kuechler returned to Texas in 1867 and entered the political arena, becoming a leading German voice in the Reconstructionist Republican Party.  He was appointed deputy collector of customs at San Antonio. Kuechler was elected a delegate to the state Constitutional Convention of 1868–69.  He was elected commissioner of the Texas General Land Office in 1870, holding the position  for the entire four years of the administration of Governor Edmund J. Davis. In 1873, he appointed Jacob Bickler as assistant draftsman and calculator. Kuechler's wife's brother-in-law Hermann Lungkwitz received an appointment for the Texas General Land Office, and Lungkwitz's daughter Martha Lungkwitz Bickler became a clerk with the office.

He became a surveyor along the Devils River and the Pecos River for the International and Great Northern Railroad and the Gulf, Western Texas and Pacific Railroad. In 1878, he was appointed principal surveyor for the Texas and Pacific Railway.

Personal life and death
Kuechler became an American citizen on October 10, 1853.

In May, 1856, Kuechler married Marie Petri, sister of painter Friedrich Richard Petri.  The couple had three sons. In 1887, the Petri family returned for a visit to Germany. Kuechler died in Austin on April 4, 1893, and is buried in Oakwood Cemetery.

References

Further reading

External links
"Jacob Kuechler" by Robert Kuhmann, Find a Grave.
 Historical Biographies-Texas General Land Office

1823 births
1893 deaths
American conscientious objectors
American foresters
Burials at Oakwood Cemetery (Austin, Texas)
Commissioners of the General Land Office of Texas
German emigrants to the United States
German-American culture in Texas
University of Giessen alumni
Forestry researchers
German foresters
Texas Republicans
19th-century American politicians